Satanic verses may refer to:

 Satanic Verses (Story of the Cranes) religious verses found in Islam
 The Satanic Verses (1988 novel) novel by Salman Rushdie
 The Satanic Verses controversy, incident surrounding the novel "The Satanic Verses", including a fatwa issued by Iran's supreme leader against the author Salman Rushdie
 Satanic Verses (song), 1994 rap song by Flatlinerz
 The legalistic extinction of verses of Islamic scripture introduced through corruption from Satan; see Naskh (tafsir)
 Verses about Lucifer, Satan, the Devil, the Beast, in Christian scripture; see Satan

See also

 Satanic (disambiguation)
 Verses (disambiguation)
 The Satanic Scriptures (2007 book) Satanist book on Satanism
 The Satanic Bible (1969 book) Satanist book on Satanism
 The Devil's Bible (13th century) medieval illuminated manuscript